Pipermethystine is a toxic alkaloid present in the aerial (aboveground) portions of the kava plant. It is not a kavalactone, containing no lactone structure. Correctly prepared kava root products will contain almost no pipermethystine.

Toxicity 
Several studies suggest pipermethystine induces hepatotoxicity in humans, and was first believed to be the cause of liver failure in individuals consuming kava supplements, but not in proper root powder or fresh root, which is consumed in the traditional kava cultures of Polynesia. Later analyses of the implicated drug materials and products revealed that medical Kava extracts contain less than 45 ppm of this alkaloid, while the leaves contain about 0.2% (2000ppm). Based on this retrospective study, pipermethystine is an unlikely cause for the observed hepatotoxicity of commercial Kava preparations.

References 

Kava
Amides
Dihydropyridines
Acetate esters